GAIL (India) Limited (formerly known as Gas Authority of India Ltd.) is a central public sector undertaking under the ownership of  Ministry of Petroleum and Natural Gas, Government of India. It is headquartered in GAIL Bhawan, New Delhi. Its operations are overseen by the Ministry of Petroleum and Natural Gas. It has the following business segments: natural gas, liquid hydrocarbon, liquefied petroleum gas transmission, petrochemical, city gas distribution, renewable Energy including Solar & Wind, exploration and production, Petrochemicals, GAILTEL and electricity generation. GAIL given the Maharatna status on 1 Feb 2013 by the Government of India. Only 10 other Public Sector Undertakings (PSUs) enjoy this coveted status amongst all Central PSUs.

GAIL owns and operates a network of around 13,722 km of natural gas pipeline and currently executing around 6,000 km of pipeline projects of its own and about 2,000 km through two JVs, as part of the National Gas Grid. PNGRB has authorized the PSU to create a 1,755 km long Mumbai-Nagpur-Jharsuguda Pipeline.

History 

GAIL (India) Limited was incorporated in August 1984 as a Central Public Sector Undertaking (PSU) under the Ministry of Petroleum & Natural Gas (MoP&NG). The company was formerly known as Gas Authority of India Limited. It is India's principal gas transmission and marketing company. The company was initially given the responsibility of construction, operation and maintenance of the Hazira – Vijaypur – Jagdishpur (HVJ) pipeline project. It was one of the largest cross-country natural gas pipeline projects in the world. GAIL commissioned the  Hazira-Vijaipur-Jagdishpur (HVJ) pipeline in 1991. Between 1991 and 1993, three liquefied petroleum gas (LPG) plants were constructed and some regional pipelines acquired, enabling GAIL to begin its gas transportation in various parts of India.

GAIL began its city gas distribution in New Delhi in 1997 by setting up nine compressed natural gas (CNG) stations.

In order to secure gas for its mainstream business, the Exploration and Production department was created. Today GAIL is a partner in the Daewoo-OVL led consortium in two offshore blocks in Myanmar, which have made a gas discovery. The bulk of its blocks are located in India in the prolific basins of Cambay, Assam-Arakan, Mahanadi, Krishna Godavary deep water and onland, Cauvery onland and deep water and western offshore. It is actively scouting for foreign blocks both exploratory or discovery.

GAIL today has reached new milestones with its strategic diversification into petrochemicals, telecom and liquid hydrocarbons besides gas infrastructure. The company has also extended its presence in power, liquefied natural gas re-gasification, city gas distribution and exploration & production through participation in equity and joint ventures. Incorporating the new-found energy into its corporate identity, Gas Authority of India was renamed GAIL (India) Limited on 22 November 2002.
	
Leveraging on the core competencies, GAIL played a key role as gas market developer in India for decades catering to major industrial sectors like power, fertilizers, and city gas distribution. GAIL transmits more than 160 million cubic metre per day at standard conditions of gas through its dedicated pipelines and have more than 70% market share in both gas transmission and marketing.

Infrastructure
GAIL owns the country's largest pipeline network, the cross-country 2300 km Hazira-Vijaipur-Jagdishpur pipeline with a capacity to handle 33.4 million cubic metre per day at standard conditions gas. Today the company owns and operates more than 11000 km of long cross country natural Gas Pipeline in India having a presence in 22 states in the country. It also owns and operates more than 2000 km long LPG pipelines in the country and operates one of the world's longest exclusive LPG pipeline in the country, from Jamnagar in Gujarat to Loni in Uttar Pradesh. The company also owns and operates seven mega LPG recovery plants in the country today and has to its credit almost 20% of domestic LPG produced and supplied for the domestic usage through its sisters PSUs like IOCL, BPCL and HPCL. GAIL is one of the major petrochemical conglomerates in the country today with India's largest gas based petrochemicals in operation since 1999. In petrochemicals it has its own gas based integrated petrochemical plant and also the ownership of 70% in dual fuel petrochemicals in Assam, Brahmaputra Cracker and Polymer Limited and one of the major equity partners in OPal.

The company supplies gas to power plants for generation of over 4,000 MW of power to the Fertilizer plants for production of 10 million tonnes of urea and to several other industries. The regional pipelines are in Mumbai, Gujarat, Rajasthan, Andhra Pradesh, Tamil Nadu, Pondicherry, Assam, Tripura, Madhya Pradesh, Haryana, Uttar Pradesh and Delhi. The Company has established six gas processing (LPG) plants, four along the HVJ pipeline two at Vijaipur, MP, one at Vaghodia, Gujarat and Auraiya, UP and one each in Lakwa, Assam and Usar, Maharashtra. These plants have the capacity to produce nearly 1 million tpa of LPG. GAIL has also set up several compressor stations for boosting the gas pressure to desired levels for its customers and internal users.

GAIL also possesses a vast telecommunication network that contributes significantly to the high level of system reliability of operations, on-line real-time communication and monitoring higher productivity.  GAIL became the first Infrastructure Provider Category II Licensee and signed the country's first Service Level Agreement for leasing bandwidth in the Delhi-Vijaipur sector in 2001, through its telecom business GAILTEL.

In 2001, GAIL commissioned the world's longest and India's first cross state LPG transmission pipeline running from Jamnagar in Gujarat to Loni in Uttar Pradesh. The total length of this LPG pipeline is 1415 km.

GAIL has started working on the Jagdishpur-Haldia/Bokaro-Dhamra Pipeline. This was earlier planned to constructed between Jagdishpur in Uttar Pradesh to Haldia in Bengal for a total length of 2050 km. But now it has been reconfigured. The pipeline will connect Varanasi to the gas grid, to link the Dhamra terminal. The over 2,500-kilometer line will be constructed in three phases and will also now connect Adani Group's Dhamra LNG import terminal in Odisha. In the first phase, a trunk pipeline from Phulpur (Allahabad) will be laid to Dobhi (Gaya) in Bihar with spur lines to Barauni and Patna. The 755-km Phase-1 project will cost Rs 3,200 crore and will be completed by December 2018. GAIL already as a line up to Phulpur. It is raising capacity of this pipeline by laying a 672-km parallel line from Vijaipur in Madhya Pradesh to Phulpur via Auriaya in Uttar Pradesh at the cost of Rs 4,300 crore. In the Phase-II, a 1200-km line would be laid from Dobhi to Bokaro/Ranchi in Jharkhand and Angul and Dharma in Odisha at the cost of Rs 5,565 crore. Phase-III will involve laying 583-km line to Haldia at the cost of Rs 3,425 crore.

Operations

Natural gas

Natural gas transmission 
GAIL's natural gas transmission segment under its natural gas business vertical consists of its natural gas pipeline infrastructure. As of 31 December 2021, GAIL owns approximately 13,800 km of operational natural gas pipeline network, which represents over 67% of India's overall 20,334 km of operational natural gas pipeline network.

In September 2021, GAIL was reported to be exploring the monetization of its Dabhol-Bengaluru and Dahej-Uran-Panvel-Dhabhol pipelines through an Infrastructure Investment Trust (InvIT) structure with the stated intent to utilize the resulting proceeds to expand its pipeline network.

The following table summarizes GAIL's natural gas pipeline network as of 31 December 2021:

Gas marketing 
Since inception in 1984, GAIL has been the undisputed leader in the marketing, transmission and distribution of natural gas in India. As India's leading natural gas major, it has been instrumental in the development of the natural gas market in the country.

GAIL sells around 51% (excluding internal usage) of the natural gas sold in the country. Of this, 37% is sold to the power sector and 26% to the fertiliser sector. GAIL is supplying around 60 million cubic metre per day at standard conditions of natural gas from domestic sources to customers across India. These customers range from the smallest of companies to mega power and fertiliser plants. GAIL has adopted a gas management system to handle multiple sources of supply and delivery of gas in a co-mingled form and provide a seamless interface between shippers, customers, transporters and suppliers. GAIL is present in 11 states: Gujarat, Rajasthan, Madhya Pradesh, Delhi, Haryana, Uttar Pradesh, Maharashtra, Tamil Nadu, Andhra Pradesh, Assam, and Tripura. They are further extending their coverage to states of Kerala, Karnataka, Punjab, Uttarakhand, West Bengal and Bihar through their upcoming pipelines.

LNG 
Under its natural gas business vertical, GAIL secures liquefied natural gas (LNG) under long-term agreements as well as short-term arrangements in the spot market.

GAIL has entered into the following long-term LNG supply arrangements:

 In December 2011, GAIL signed a 20-year, 3.5 million tons per annum (mtpa) LNG supply agreement with Sabine Pass Liquefaction, LLC, a subsidiary of Cheniere Energy Partners LP (NYSE:CQP), for delivery of LNG commencing upon the start of operations of the fourth train of its liquefaction terminal based in Sabine Pass, Louisiana.
 In October 2012, GAIL signed a 20-year, 2.5 mtpa LNG supply agreement with Gazprom Marketing & Trading Singapore, a wholly owned subsidiary of Gazprom Marketing & Trading, for delivery of LNG beginning in 2018-2019.
 In April 2013, GAIL signed a 20-year, 2.3 mtpa LNG supply agreement with Dominion Energy Inc. (NYSE:D) for delivery of LNG commencing upon the start of operations of its Dominion Cove Point LNG liquefaction terminal beginning in 2017.

Additionally, GAIL has entered into the following short- to medium-term LNG supply agreements:

 In October 2010, GAIL signed a 3-year, 0.5 mtpa LNG supply agreement with Marubeni for delivery of LNG commencing in January 2011.
 In August 2012, GAIL signed a 0.8 million ton LNG supply agreement with GDF Suez for delivery of 12 LNG cargoes from 2013 to 2014.
 In August 2012, GAIL signed a 0.725 million ton LNG supply agreement with Gas Natural Fenosa for delivery of LNG for 3 years commencing in January 2013.

Through its wholly owned subsidiary GAIL Global Singapore Pte Ltd (GGSPL), GAIL engages in the trading of LNG; GGSPL has master sale and purchase agreements (MSPAs) with more than 35 third-parties.

In additional, GAIL is a 12.50% equity owner of Petronet LNG Limited (PLL), which has entered into the following LNG supply agreements:

 In 1999, PLL signed a 7.5 mtpa sales and purchase agreement with Ras Laffan Liquefied Natural Gas Co. Limited (II) (Qatargas); the delivery of the first 5.0 mtpa (phase 1) began in January 2004. Following the execution of a sider letter agreement in August 2006, the delivery of the remaining 2.5 mtpa began in 2009.
 In August 2009, PLL signed a 20-year, 1.5 mtpa LNG supply agreement with a subsidiary of ExxonMobil for delivery of LNG from the Gorgon LNG project in western Australia.
 In January 2016, PLL signed another 1.0 mtpa sales and purchase agreement with Qatargas bringing its total contracted capacity to 8.5 mtpa.

Liquid hydrocarbons 
GAIL has marketing gas processing units (GPUs) products, namely liquefied petroleum gas, propane, pentane, naphtha and by-products of polymer plant, namely MFO, propylene and hydrogenated C4 mix. LPG is being sold exclusively to PSU oil marketing companies (OMCs) while other products are sold directly to customers in the retail segment.

GAIL is India's major producer of propane, popularly known as GAIL Propane. It is an eco-friendly fuel and provides an effective way of reducing pollution and increasing productivity.

GAIL produces and markets pentane. It is primarily being used for reprocessing into iso, normal and commercial pentane used in EPS, PU, LAB industry.

Acetone and phenol are being produced from propylene by blending with benzene which are mainly used in the pharmaceutical industry.

MFO is mainly used as fuel for heating, paint spraying, and furniture polishing. Naphtha is primarily used by power, Fertilizer, steel and Petrochemical units. In power, steel units it is used as a fuel, whereas in petrochemical, chemical, fertilizer units it is used as a feedstock.

GAIL is operating seven gas processing units (GPU) located at Vijaipur (two units), Auraiya, Vaghodia, Usar, Lakwa and Gandhar plants for production of LPG and GCU at Pata plant for production of polymer. In the process of production of main products, such as LPG and polymer through GPU/GCU except the Usar, the following by-products- liquid hydrocarbons (LHC) are produced:

LPG production and transmission 
Liquefied petroleum gas (LPG) is the most widely used domestic and commercial fuel in India. Over the past four years, GAIL has emerged as one of the major LPG producers in the country. Around 90 per cent of the LPG is consumed in India as fuel by the household sector, while the balance is sold to industrial and commercial customers. GAIL has seven LPG Plants, two at Vijaipur and one at Vaghodia, and one each in Lakwa (Assam), Auraiya (UP), Gandhar (Gujarat) and Usar (Maharashtra), producing over 1 million TPA LPG and other liquid hydrocarbons.

GAIL is the first company in India to own and operate pipelines for LPG transmission. It has 2038 km LPG pipeline network 1,415 km of which connects the western and northern parts of India and 623 km of networks is in the southern part of the country connecting to the Eastern Coast. The LPG transmission system has a capacity to transport 3.8 million tonnes per year of LPG. LPG transmission through pipelines was 3145 TMT in the year 2013–14.

GAIL has a share of about 10% of the Indian LPG market in LPG production and 7% in LPG sales.

GAIL produces LPG through fractionation in gas processing units, known as straight run LPG. GAIL's LPG is an eco-friendly fuel and provides a cheaper and effective means of reducing pollution and increasing productivity.

GAIL LPG is being supplied to PSU Oil Marketing Companies namely IOCL, BPCL and HPCL ex-GPUs at Import Parity Price.

Petrochemicals 
GAIL diversified from gas marketing and transmission into the polymer business by setting up North India's first gas based Petrochemicals complex. Even without having any prior experience in petrochemicals, GAIL commissioned the plant successfully in the year 1999. The petrochemical business is one of the core focus areas of GAIL.

GAIL owns and operates a gas based Petrochemical Complex at PATA, District Auraiya, near Kanpur in UP (around 380 km from Delhi). GAIL has world class "Sclairtech" solution polymerization process licensed from M/s Nova Chemicals, Canada to produce LLDPE and HDPE, with a nameplate capacity of 210,000 million tonnes per year and has two slurry based polymerization processes licensed from M/s Mitsui Chemicals, Japan to produce HDPE, each with a nameplate capacity of 100,000 million tonnes per year. A new world class gas phase Unipol PE Process of M/s Univation Technology, USA, with a nameplate capacity of 400,000 million tonnes per year, has been commissioned at PATA to produce HDPE/LLDPE.

GAIL Pata is the only HDPE/LLDPE plant operating in Northern India and has a dominant market share in North India. The primary thrust markets for the polymers had been Western India, but, with the entry of GAIL in the HDPE & LLDPE market Verticals, today North India has also witnessed a rapid and significant growth in the polymer downstream processing Verticals. In a successful span of about a decades of establishing and marketing its grades under the brand names G-Lex and G-Lene, GAIL has alongside augmented its name plate capacity of HDPE and LLDPE to  MTPA by adding another dedicated HDPE downstream polymerisation unit of  MTPA.

GAIL has 70% equity in joint venture company Brahmaputra Cracker & Polymer Limited (BCPL) in Dibrugarh, Assam with a nameplate capacity of 220 KTA of HDPE & LLDPE and 60 KTA of PP. GAIL has acquired equity in OPaL's Greenfield petrochemical project at Dahej to produce 1060 KTA of HDPE & LLDPE and 340 KTA of PP. 
GAIL is a co-promoter with 17% equity stake in ONGC Petro-additions Limited (OPaL) which is implementing a green field petrochemical complex of 1.1 million tonnes per year ethylene capacity at Dahej in the state of Gujarat.

The current per capita consumption of plastics in India is about 1.8 kg compared with the world average of 17 kg. Demand and supply projections indicate a progressively increasing domestic offtake. Being the only plant outside western India, it offers easy access to polymer consumers in Northern India and parts of Central India.

City gas distribution 
GAIL is the pioneer of city gas distribution in India. GAIL took many initiatives to introduce PNG for households and CNG for the transport sector to address the rising pollution levels. Pilot projects were launched in the early 1990s in two metros Delhi and Mumbai through joint venture companies Indraprastha Gas Limited (IGL) and Mahanagar Gas Limited (MGL) leading to the start of commercial operation of city gas projects. The results of these ventures are quite visible through the improvement in air quality in these cities.

Based on the success of IGL and MGL, GAIL has further set up six more JVCs viz Bhagyanagar Gas Limited, Andhra Pradesh; Avantika Gas Limited in Madhya Pradesh; Central U P Gas Limited & Green Gas Limited in Uttar Pradesh; Maharashtra Natural Gas Limited in Pune Maharashtra and Tripura Natural Gas Company Limited in Tripura for CGD projects in various cities.

However, Ministry of Petroleum & Natural Gas established the Petroleum and Natural Gas Regulatory Board (PNGRB) with effect from 01.10.2007, under the Petroleum and Natural Gas Regulatory Board Act 2006, to regulate the refining, processing, storage, transportation, distribution, marketing and sale of petroleum, petroleum products and natural gas excluding production of crude oil and natural gas. The Petroleum & Natural Gas Regulatory Board Act-2006 provides the legal framework for the development of the natural gas pipelines and city or local gas distribution networks. With the arrival of the PNGRB the implementation of PNG in various cities is being taken up in a phased manner as and when the bids are called for by the regulator.

Exploration and production 
GAIL is participating in 10 exploration blocks, in Basins such as Mahanadi, Mumbai, Cambay, Assam-Arakan, Tripura Fold Belt, Gujarat Kutch, Krishna Godavari, Cauvery and Cauvery Palar. GAIL has partnership in these blocks with various companies such as ONGC, OIL, GSPC, Hardy Exploration & Production, Petrogas, JOGPL, Eni and Daewoo as Operators. Out of these 10 E&P blocks, 2 blocks are overseas (A-1 and A-3 blocks in Myanmar).

The blocks are in various stages of exploration, appraisal and development. Hydrocarbon discoveries are in place in 7 E&P blocks in blocks where GAIL is participating. The blocks with hydrocarbon discoveries are: MN-OSN-2000/2, CB-ONN-2000/1, Block A-1 and A-3 Myanmar, CY-OS/2, AA-ONN-2002/1, CB-ONN-2003/2.

Production of crude oil is in progress from Cambay Onland block (CB-ONN-2000/1) @ 1250 barrels per day. Development activities are in progress in 2 blocks in Burma (A-1 and A-3) and production of gas is expected from May 2013. Declaration of Commerciality has been approved by the Government in Mahanadi Offshore (MN-OSN-2000/2) block. In other blocks where hydrocarbon discoveries have been made, the appraisal is in progress.

GAIL is an active member of multi-organisation team (MOT) set-up for assessment of shale gas potential in Indian basins. The other representative in MOT are from DGH (Directorate General of Hydrocarbons), ONGC and Oil India Limited (OIL).

GAIL is also a member of National Gas Hydrate Programme being coordinated by DGH and is actively involved in activities related to gas hydrate exploration.

Subsidiaries

GAIL Gas Limited 
GAIL Gas is a wholly owned subsidiary of GAIL. GAIL Gas has been selected for implementation of City Gas Distribution (CGD) projects in four cities, namely, Kota, Dewas, Sonipat, and Meerut  in the first round of bidding by the Petroleum & Natural Gas Regulatory Board (PNGRB). GAIL Gas supply CNG & PNG (industrial, commercial and household customers) in the city of Dewas, Meerut, Sonepat, Varanasi and Kota.  GAIL GAS is providing natural gas to approximately 350 industrial consumers in TTZ (Taj Trapezium Zone) area (Agra and Firozabad) in Uttar Pradesh India. GAIL GAS has also started the CGD work in Bengaluru Karnataka recently.

Brahmaputra Cracker and Polymer Limited (BCPL) 
GAIL has 70% equity share in BCPL, a Joint Venture, with Oil India Limited (OIL), Numaligarh Refinery Limited (NRL), Govt. of Assam, each having 10% equity share. Feedstock Supply Agreements have been signed between BCPL and all the three suppliers, viz., Oil and Natural Gas Corporation Limited, Oil India Limited and Numaligarh Refinery Limited. Technology licence agreements have been signed for cracker, polyethylene and polypropylene units.

BCPL was dedicated to the nation by Hon'ble Prime Minister of India Shri Narendra Modi on 5 February 2016. The financial commitment to the extent of  has been made. The plant is presently in O&M phase with capacity utilization of more 100%. In the financial year 2019-20, the plant operated at 108% capacity utilization.

GAIL Global (Singapore) Pte Limited 
GAIL has a wholly owned subsidiary, namely, GAIL Global (Singapore) Pte Ltd., to manage investments abroad. GAIL is looking for further business opportunities through this subsidiary company. The official website for GAIL Global Singapore Pte Ltd. is http://www.ggspl.com/ . To know more about this subsidiary download the fact sheet.

GAIL Global (USA) Inc.

GAIL Global (USA) LNG LLC

Joint ventures 

Aavantika Gas Limited (AGL)
AGL is in operation in Indore and Ujjain and is supplying CNG to the transport sector in these cities. AGL is supplying CNG to almost 9,000 vehicles in both the cities. AGL has plans to set up five and two CNG stations in Gwalior and Ujjain respectively, and domestic supplies to households. Six daughter stations are mechanically ready for CNG dispensing, awaiting for CCOE final approval. MoPNG has authorised AGL for CGD in Indore, Gwalior and Ujjain. GAIL has 22.5% stake in the Company along with HPCL as an equal partner.

Bhagyanagar Gas Limited (BGL)
BGL is operating six CNG stations in Vijayawada and 4 CNG stations in Hyderabad and one CNG station in the Rajamahendravaram. BGL is supplying CNG in these three cities to almost 6,000 vehicles. BGL is also operating two Auto LPG stations in Hyderabad and one Auto LPG station in Tirupati. BGL has received authorisation from MoPNG for City Gas Distribution (CGD) in Hyderabad and Vijayawada. GAIL has a 22.5% stake in the company along with HPCL as an equal partner.

Central U.P. Gas Limited (CUGL)
CUGL is operating 15 CNG stations in Kanpur, Unnao and two CNG stations in the Bareily. CUGL is supplying CNG to almost 45,000 vehicles in the two cities. CUGL commenced its domestic supply of PNG with connexions to 15000 households in Kanpur and Bareilly. CUGL has received authorisation from MoPNG for CGD in Kanpur, Unnao, Bareilly & Jhansi. GAIL has 25% stake in the Company along with BPCL as an equal partner. CUGL has connected 200 commercial and industrial units in both the cities.

Green Gas Limited (GGL)
GGL is operating six CNG stations in Lucknow and three CNG stations in Agra. GGL is supplying CNG in the two cities. GGL has tied up for the commencement of domestic supply of PNG with connexions to households, commercial and industrial establishments. MoPNG has authorised GGL for CGD in Lucknow and Agra. GAIL has a 22.5% stake in the company along with IOCL as an equal partner.

Indraprastha Gas Limited (IGL)
IGL is the largest CGD entity in terms of CNG sales and the number of vehicles supplied by CNG in India. IGL has received authorisation from MoPNG for CGD in Delhi and its suburbs viz. NOIDA (Gautam Budh Nagar), Greater NOIDA, Faridabad and Ghaziabad and part of Gurugram from State Govt. of Haryana. IGL is supplying piped gas to around 900,000 domestic, 3500 Commercial, 1600 small industrial consumers and CNG to over 10,00,000 vehicles through around 425 CNG stations in NCR. GAIL has a 22.5% stake in the company along with BPCL as an equal partner.

Mahanagar Gas Limited (MGL)
MGL is a joint venture of GAIL and British Gas. MGL has set up 140 CNG stations catering to over 200,000 vehicles spread over Mumbai, Thane, Mira-Bhayandar and Navi-Mumbai areas besides supplying PNG to over 450,000 domestic customers, more than 1,000 small industrial and commercial consumers. It has received authorisation from MoPNG for CGD in Mumbai, District Thane including Navi Mumbai and Mira Bhayander. GAIL has a 49.75% stake in the company along with British Gas as an equal partner.

Maharashtra Natural Gas Limited (MNGL)
MNGL is a joint venture of GAIL and Bharat Petroleum Corporation Limited (BPCL) for implementation of City Gas Projects in and around Pune city. MNGL has received authorisation from MoPNG for CGD in Nashik, Pune including Pimpri, Chinchwad, Talegaon, Hinjewadi and Chakan areas. It has started 10 stations supplying CNG to nearly 5,000 vehicles.  GAIL has a 22.5% stake in the company along with BPCL as an equal partner.

ONGC Petro-additions Limited (OPaL)
GAIL is in the process of acquiring the equity stake in ONGC Petro- additions Limited (OPaL), which is a joint venture of GAIL with Oil and Natural Gas Corporation Ltd. and Gujarat State Petroleum Corporation Ltd., for setting up Petrochemical Project at Dahej in Gujarat. OPaL is setting up a green field petrochemical complex of 1.1 million tonnes per year ethylene capacity (dual feed cracker) in Dahej, Gujarat.

Four main players dominate the petrochemical sector, namely, Reliance Industries Ltd. (RIL), Indian oil (IOCL), Gas Authority of India Ltd. (GAIL), and Haldia Petrochemicals Ltd. A New Chapter to this Industry has been added by the evolution of ONGC Petro additions Ltd. (OPaL) on 15 November 2006 which is a joint venture company of Oil and Natural Gas Corporation Limited (ONGC), Gujarat State Petroleum Corporation Ltd. (GSPCL) and GAIL India Ltd. is a grass root Mega Petrochemical complex of Global scale based on dual feed i.e., C2/C3/C4 & Naphtha at Dahej special Economic Zone (SEZ), Gujarat. The complex consists of Dual Feed Ethylene cracker (with C2/ C3/ C4 and Naphtha feed ) of 1100KTPA capacity to produce Ethylene and Propylene as Petrochemical Feedstock to downstream units of Polyethylene (LLDPE, HDPE) and Polypropylene(PP) and associated unit i.e., PyGas Hydrotreating, Benzene and Butadiene extraction plants to produce other products (Pygas, 1,3- Butadiene and Benzene). Utility and offsite facilities to cater to complex requirement is built within the Complex which includes ECTS and CPP.  The grass root complex is located at a distance of about 10 km to the ONGC's C2+ Extraction Plant within Special Economic zone (SEZ) at Dahej, Gulf of Khambhat.

Feed system: C2, C3 & C4 feed is sourced from existing C2+ recovery plant of ONGC in Dahej (at a distance of 10 km) through the pipeline. Mixed Naphtha (LAN & ARN) in definite proportionate from Hazira is sourced to Petrochemical complex through a separate pipeline.

Saleable products: The products are  dispatched through various modes, like bagging, truck, rail, tanker loading and through pipelines.

Petronet LNG Limited (PLL)
PLL has been formed for setting up of LNG import and regasification facilities. PLL has a long term LNG supply contract with Qatargas, Qatar, for import of 7.5 million tonnes per year of LNG. PLL Dahej terminal in Gujarat has been expanded to 10 million tonnes per year capacity. PLL has successfully implemented a pilot project for supplying LNG through cryogenic road tankers. PLL is also coming up with an LNG terminal at Kochi, Kerala, with an initial capacity of 2.5 million tonnes per year, expandable up to 5 million tonnes per year and it was scheduled to be operational by end of 2011. GAIL has a 12.5% equity stake in PLL, along with BPCL, ONGC and IOCL as equal partners.

Ratnagiri Gas and Power Pvt. Ltd. (RGPPL)
RGPPL is a joint venture company between GAIL, NTPC, Financial Institutions and MSEB. The capacity of the Ratnagiri Gas & Power Station is 2,150 MW, which is the largest gas based power generation facility in the country and is producing 1,850 MW of power. RGPPL is in the process of commissioning an LNG import terminal of 5 million tonnes per year capacity. GAIL has 32.88% stake in the company along with NTPC as an equal partner.

Tripura Natural Gas Company Limited (TNGCL)
TNGCL is supplying gas to around 7,500 domestic, 170 commercial and industrial consumers and has set up one CNG station in Agartala, which is catering to more than 1,400 vehicles. TNGCL has received authorisation from MoPNG for CGD in Agartala. GAIL has 29% stake in the company.

GAIL China Gas Global Energy Holdings Limited
The joint venture company has been formed with an objective to pursue gas sector opportunities, mainly in China. GAIL has 50% equity interest in the company along with China Gas as the equal partner. The joint venture company is in the process of identifying projects in gas and other related areas in China.

ANDHRA PRADESH GAS DISTRIBUTION CORPORATION
The joint venture company has been formed with an objective to reduce the gap between gas demand and supply, mainly in Andhra Pradesh. GAIL Gas Limited has 50% equity interest in the company along with APGIC (Andhra Pradesh Gas Infrastructure Corporation) as the equal partner.

Global presence 
As a strategy of going global and further expanding global footprint, GAIL has formed a wholly owned subsidiary company, GAIL Global (Singapore) Pte Ltd. in Singapore for pursuing overseas business opportunities including LNG & petrochemical trading. GAIL has also established a wholly owned subsidiary, GAIL Global (USA) Inc. in Texas, USA. The US subsidiary has acquired 20% working interest in an unincorporated joint venture with Carrizo Oil & Gas Inc in the Eagle Ford shale acreage in the state of Texas. In addition to having two wholly owned subsidiaries in Singapore and the US, GAIL has a representative office in Cairo, Egypt to pursue business opportunities in Africa and the Middle East.

GAIL is also an equity partner in two retail gas companies in Egypt, namely Fayum Gas Company (FGC) and National Gas Company (Natgas). Besides, GAIL is an equity partner in a retail gas company involved in city gas and CNG business in China – China Gas Holdings Limited (China Gas). Further, GAIL and China Gas have formed an equally owned joint venture company – GAIL China Gas Global Energy Holdings Limited for pursuing gas sector opportunities primarily in China.

GAIL is a part of the consortium in two offshore E&P blocks in Myanmar and also holds participating interest in the joint venture company – South East Asia Gas Pipeline Company Limited incorporated for transportation of gas to be produced from two blocks in Burma (Myanmar) to China.

Corporate social responsibility 
In terms of the guidelines issued by the Department of Public Enterprises, GAIL has allocated an annual budget of 2% of the previous year's profit after tax for CSR activities, which is effectively used for carefully chosen programmes. Socially useful programmes have been undertaken in GAIL since its inception in and around the areas adjoining its major work centres under the SCP/TSP Plan. But over the years, the scope of the CSR activities, the nature of programmes undertaken and the systems adopted for the implementation of these programmes have been streamlined and strengthened and the work under SCP/TSP came under the wider scope of CSR. Today, CSR & sustainability development is accorded high priority in the organisational ethos and attempted to be interwoven in all the business activities and the projects that are being undertaken by the company.

For the year 2010–11 under the thrust area Community Development, programmes worth  are endorsed and the implementation of these projects is in progression.

GAIL (India) Ltd. extended its support for the reconstruction and renovation of numerous public utilities/buildings which improved living standards not only for a person or family but for the whole of the villages where this project was implemented. For the sustainable development of the whole community GAIL is also supporting integrated livelihood programmes in villages especially for small and marginal farmers. This would be considered as a drop in the vast ocean but GAIL along with other Oil PSUs is contributing towards provision of LPG connections to BPL families under Rajiv Gandhi Gramin LPG Vitrak Yojana. This collaborative combined effort of the Oil PSUs would be able to generate a huge wave in the ocean in UP region. GAIL believes that for providing better tomorrow for the community where it has its working the focus should be on the future of the community i.e. children and students. So in view of this belief GAIL is providing vehicles for distribution of a mid-day meal for underprivileged children of government schools so as to encourage the young girls and boys to educate themselves for their better and secured lives. GAIL in the minuscule of its efforts have tried to touch every aspect of life by providing Night shelters and blankets to villagers, adoption of destitute tribal children of the orphanage in the tribal area, generating AIDS awareness and a behaviour change communication programme for truckers of national highways and providing school bus for physically challenged students.
In just two years, more than 314,000 families have benefited from the programmes under Community Development.

Sponsorship
Currently a sponsor of Durand Cup.

See also
 List of public sector undertakings in India

References

External links 
 

Companies based in New Delhi
Oil and gas companies of India
Natural gas pipeline companies
Government-owned companies of India
NIFTY 50
Indian companies established in 1984
Petrochemical companies of India
Government-owned energy companies
Natural gas companies of India
India
1984 establishments in Delhi
Companies listed on the National Stock Exchange of India
Companies listed on the Bombay Stock Exchange